In Search of Aliens is an American television series that premiered on July 25, 2014 on the H2 channel. Produced by Prometheus Entertainment, the program features Giorgio A. Tsoukalos, a leading contributor to the television show Ancient Aliens who promotes the pseudoscientific notion that ancient astronauts visited Earth and influenced human culture.

The show has received criticism from critics and organizations such as the Southern Poverty Law Center, who describe the show as promoting "racist pseudo-scholarship".

Episodes

Episode 1: The Hunt for Atlantis
Episode 2: Nazi Time Travelers
Episode 3: The Mystery of Loch Ness
Episode 4: The Roswell Rock
Episode 5: Searching for Bigfoot
Episode 6: The Mystery of the Cyclops
Episode 7: The Mystery of Puma Punku
Episode 8: The Founding of America
Episode 9: The Mystery of Nazca
Episode 10: The Alien Code

Criticism 
According to reviewer Jason Colavito, the information presented in the show "added up to nothing", there was "no overriding thesis or purpose", and Tsoukalos admits "he doesn’t buy into what his interviewees said". Colavito wrote that "In Search of Aliens is an ersatz America Unearthed that lacks even the dubious expertise of Scott F. Wolter, who, for all his faults, produces more interesting television by having the courage of his convictions and coming to lunatic conclusions from a consistent (if skewed) reading of “evidence” he investigates".

Colavito named ancient astronauts as "one of the more elaborate theories in pseudo-history with a racist component”. According to Alexander Zaitchik writing for the Southern Poverty Law Center's Hatewatch blog, shows that promote fringe history like In Search of Aliens are embraced by the far right because they help in "raising the profile of racist pseudo-scholarship", such as German writer Jan Udo Holey, whose antisemitic books have been banned across Europe.

See also
 List of topics characterized as pseudoscience
 Pseudoarchaeology
 Ancient Aliens
 Unsealed Alien Files
 In Search of... (TV series)

References

External links
 

Ancient astronaut speculation
English-language television shows
H2 (A&E networks) original programming
Paranormal television
UFO-related television
2014 American television series debuts